Scott G. Bullock is an American lawyer who focuses on property rights issues such as eminent domain and civil forfeiture. He has been President and General Counsel at the Institute for Justice since 2016, a nonprofit libertarian public interest law firm. He represented Susette Kelo in Kelo v. City of New London, an eminent domain case decided by the Supreme Court in 2005. Bullock was a senior attorney before becoming the president of the institute and directed many cases on state and federal level. In 1994 he represented the institute in a forum on C-SPAN.

Education
Bullock was born in Guantanamo Bay, Cuba, and grew up in suburban Pittsburgh, Pennsylvania. He received his B.A. in economics and philosophy from Grove City College and his J.D. degree from the University of Pittsburgh School of Law. Bullock joined the Institute for Justice at its founding in 1991.

Career
Bullock was lead co-counsel in the 2005 Supreme Court case Kelo v. City of New London. After the decision by the high court to allow the City of New London to seize the homes and businesses of current residences to make room for a "90-acre office, hotel, and housing complex", Bullock said that it was "a sad day for the country and a sad day for the Constitution."

Bullock has also been successful in winning cases of lawsuits in New Jersey, Tennessee as well as in Mississippi.

Bullock has advocated against government use of civil forfeiture. He has said that when the police pull drivers over for minor traffic infractions and seize their cash, they do not "respect fundamental notions of due process." He represented Russ Caswell when the police tried to seize Caswell's motel in Tewksbury, Massachusetts after incidents of illegal drug activity on the premises.

He called the practice of equitable sharing, in which state and federal law enforcement share the proceeds of seized assets, a violation of federalism. He has been involved in First Amendment and commercial speech cases. He is an advocate for parental rights.

Bullock has shared his views on constitutional issues in publications such as The New York Times and The Wall Street Journal as well as in broadcast media such as 60 Minutes, ABC Nightly News, and National Public Radio.

References

External links
 Scott Bullock profile page, Institute for Justice

Year of birth missing (living people)
University of Pittsburgh School of Law alumni
Grove City College alumni
Lawyers from Pittsburgh
Living people
American libertarians
American civil rights lawyers
Human rights lawyers
Guantanamo Bay Naval Base
Trial lawyers
Public defenders